This list of Baptist World Alliance National Fellowships is not exhaustive. The information comes from the Baptist World Alliance.

Statistics
According to a denomination census released in 2021, it has 245 Baptist denominations members in 128 countries, 173,000 churches and 49,000,000 baptized members.

All-Africa Baptist Fellowship 
 Angola : Baptist Convention of Angola 
 Burundi : Union of Baptist Churches in Burundi 
 Cameroon : Cameroon Baptist Church 
 Cameroon : Cameroon Baptist Convention 
 Cameroon : Union of Baptist Churches of Cameroon
 Central African Republic : Baptist Churches of the Central African Republic 
 Central African Republic : Evangelical Baptist Church of the Central African Republic 
 Chad : Baptist Evangelical Church of Chad
 Democratic Republic of the Congo : Baptist Community of Congo 
 Democratic Republic of the Congo : Baptist Community of the Congo River 
 Ethiopia : Ethiopian Addis Kidan Baptist Church
 Ghana : Ghana Baptist Convention
 Ivory Coast : Union of Missionary Baptist Churches in Ivory Coast
 Kenya : Baptist Convention of Kenya
 Liberia : Liberia Baptist Missionary and Educational Convention
 Madagascar : Association of Bible Baptist Churches in Madagascar 
 Malawi : African Baptist Assembly of Malawi, Inc. 
 Malawi : Baptist Convention of Malawi 
 Mozambique : Baptist Convention of Mozambique 
 Namibia : Baptist Convention of Namibia
 Nigeria : Nigerian Baptist Convention
 Rwanda : Union of Baptist Churches in Rwanda 
 Sierra Leone : Baptist Convention of Sierra Leone
 South Africa : Baptist Convention of South Africa 
 South Africa : Baptist Union of Southern Africa
 Sudan : Sudan Interior Church
 Tanzania : Baptist Convention of Tanzania
 Togo : Togo Baptist Convention
 Uganda : Baptist Union of Uganda
 Zambia : Baptist Convention of Zambia
 Zambia : Baptist Fellowship of Zambia
 Zambia : Baptist Union of Zambia
 Zimbabwe : Baptist Convention of Zimbabwe

Asia Pacific Baptist Federation 
 Australia : Baptist Union of Australia
 Bangladesh : Bangladesh Baptist Church Fellowship
 Bangladesh : Bangladesh Baptist Church Sangha
 Bangladesh : Bangladesh Free Baptist Churches
 Cambodia : Cambodia Baptist Union
 Fiji : Fiji Baptist Convention
 Hong Kong : Baptist Convention of Hong Kong
 India : Arunachal Baptist Church Council
 India : Assam Baptist Convention
 India : Council of Baptist Churches in Eastern India
 India : Baptist Church of Mizoram
 India : Baptist Union of North India
 India : Bengal Baptist Fellowship
 India : Bengal Orissa Bihar Baptist Convention
 India : Convention of Baptist Churches of the Northern Circars
 India : Evangelical Baptist Convention of India
 India : Garo Baptist Convention
 India : Gospel Association of India
 India : India Association of General Baptists
 India : Karbi-Anglong Baptist Convention
 India : Karnataka Baptist Convention
 India : Lower Assam Baptist Union
 India : Maharashtra Baptist Society
 India : Manipur Baptist Convention
 India : Nagaland Baptist Church Council
 India : Orissa Baptist Evangelical Crusade
 Indonesia : Convention of Indonesian Baptist Churches 
 Indonesia : Union of Indonesian Baptist Churches 
 Japan : Japan Baptist Convention 
 Korea : Korea Baptist Convention
 Malaysia : Malaysia Baptist Convention
 Myanmar : Myanmar Baptist Convention
 Nepal : Nepal Baptist Church Council
 Papua New Guinea : Baptist Union of Papua New Guinea
 New Zealand : Baptist Union of New Zealand
 Philippines : Association of Baptist Churches for Luzon, Visayas, Mindanao
 Philippines : Baptist Conference of the Philippines
 Philippines : Convention of Philippine Baptist Churches
 Philippines : Convention of Visayas and Mindanao of Southern Baptist Churches
 Singapore : Singapore Baptist Convention
 Thailand : Thailand Karen Baptist Convention
 Taiwan : Chinese Baptist Convention
 Vanuatu : Vanuatu Baptist Churches
 Vietnam : Baptist Churches in Vietnam

Caribbean Baptist Fellowship 
 Bahamas : Bahamas National Baptist Missionary and Educational Convention
 Barbados : Barbados Baptist Convention
 Cuba : Baptist Convention of Eastern Cuba 
 Cuba : Baptist Convention of Western Cuba 
 Guyana : Baptist Convention of Guyana
 Haiti : Baptist Convention of Haiti 
 Haiti : Evangelical Baptist Mission of South Haiti 
 Jamaica : Jamaica Baptist Union
 Trinidad & Tobago : Baptist Union of Trinidad and Tobago

Union of Baptists in Latin America 
 Argentina : Evangelical Baptist Convention of Argentina 
 Belize : Baptist Association of Belize
 Bolivia : Bolivian Baptist Union 
 Brazil : Brazilian Baptist Convention 
 Brazil : National Baptist Convention, Brazil 
 Chile : Union of Evangelical Baptist Churches of Chile 
 Colombia : Colombian Baptist Denomination
 Costa Rica : Federation of Baptist Associations of Costa Rica 
 Ecuador : Ecuadorian Baptist Convention     
 El Salvador : Baptist Association of El Salvador 
 Guatemala : Convention of Baptist Churches in Guatemala 
 Honduras : National Convention of Baptist Churches in Honduras 
 Mexico : National Baptist Convention of Mexico 
 Nicaragua : Baptist Convention of Nicaragua 
 Panama : Baptist Convention of Panama
 Paraguay : Baptist Evangelical Convention of Paraguay 
 Peru : Baptist Evangelical Convention of Peru 
 Venezuela : National Baptist Convention of Venezuela

European Baptist Federation 
 Armenia : Union of Evangelical Christian Baptist Churches of Armenia
 Austria : Baptist Union of Austria
 Azerbaijan : Union of Evangelical Christian Baptists of Azerbaijan
 Belarus : Union of Evangelical Christian Baptists of Belarus
 Belgium : Union of Baptists in Belgium
 Bosnia and Herzegovina : Baptist Church in Bosnia and Herzegovina
 Bulgaria : Baptist Union of Bulgaria
 Croatia : Baptist Union of Croatia
 Czech Republic : Baptist Union in the Czech Republic
 Denmark : Baptist Union of Denmark
 Egypt : Egyptian Baptist Convention
 Estonia : Union of Free Evangelical & Baptist Churches of Estonia
 Finland : Swedish Baptist Union of Finland and Finnish Baptist Union
 France : Federation of Evangelical Baptist Churches of France
 Georgia : Evangelical Baptist Church of Georgia
 Germany : Union of Evangelical Free Church Congregations in Germany
 Hungary : Baptist Union of Hungary
 Israel : Association of Baptist Churches in Israel
 Italy : Baptist Evangelical Christian Union of Italy
 Jordan : Jordan Baptist Convention
 Latvia : Union of Baptist Churches in Latvia
 Lebanon : Lebanese Baptist Evangelical Convention
 Lithuania : Baptist Union of Lithuania
 Moldova : Union of Christian Evangelical Baptist Churches of Moldova
 Netherlands : Union of Baptist Churches in the Netherlands
 Norway : Baptist Union of Norway
 Palestine : Council of Local Evangelical Churches in the Holy Land 
 Poland : Baptist Union of Poland
 Portugal : Portuguese Baptist Convention
 Romania : Union of Christian Baptist Churches in Romania
 Russia : Union of Evangelical Christians-Baptists of Russia
 Serbia : Union of Baptist Churches in Serbia
 Slovakia : Baptist Union of Slovakia
 Spain : Baptist Evangelical Union of Spain
 Sweden : Uniting Church in Sweden
 Switzerland : Swiss Baptist Union
 Syria : Baptist Convention of Syria
 Ukraine : All-Ukrainian Union of Churches of Evangelical Christian Baptists
 United Kingdom : Baptist Union of Great Britain
 United Kingdom : Baptist Union of Scotland
 United Kingdom : Baptist Union of Wales
 Yugoslavia : Union of Evangelical Christians-Baptists of Yugoslavia

North American Baptist Fellowship 
 Canada : Canadian Baptist Ministries 
 Canada : Canadian National Baptist Convention 
 United States : American Baptist Churches USA 
 United States : Baptist General Association of Virginia 
 United States : Baptist General Convention of Missouri 
 United States : Baptist General Convention of Texas 
 United States : Chin Baptist Churches USA 
 United States : Converge Worldwide 
 United States : Cooperative Baptist Fellowship 
 United States : Czechoslovak Baptist Convention of USA & Canada 
 United States : District of Columbia Baptist Convention 
 United States : General Association of General Baptists 
 United States : Lott Carey Baptist Foreign Mission Convention 
 United States : National Baptist Convention of America International, Inc. 
 United States : National Missionary Baptist Convention of America 
 United States : North American Baptist Conference 
 United States : Progressive National Baptist Convention 
 United States : Russian-Ukrainian Evangelical Baptist Union, USA, Inc. 
 United States : Seventh Day Baptist General Conference USA & Canada
 United States : Union of Latvian Baptists in America 
 United States : Zomi Baptist Churches of America

Bibliography
 William H. Brackney, Historical Dictionary of the Baptists, Scarecrow Press, USA, 2009
 Robert E. Johnson, A Global Introduction to Baptist Churches, Cambridge University Press, UK, 2010
 J. Gordon Melton, Martin Baumann, Religions of the World: A Comprehensive Encyclopedia of Beliefs and Practices, ABC-CLIO, USA, 2010

References

 
Denominations
Baptist